Gareth Richard Thomas (born 15 July 1967) is a British politician who has served as the Member of Parliament (MP) for Harrow West since 1997. A member of Labour and Co-operative, he held the position of Minister of State at the Department for International Development from 2008 to 2010. Following the 2010 general election, Thomas joined the shadow frontbench team.
 
Thomas is currently Shadow Minister for Trade Policy under the leadership of Keir Starmer. He served as Chair of the Co-operative Party from 2001 until 2019. Thomas sought to become the Labour Party's candidate in the 2016 election for Mayor of London, but came last of the six candidates in the ballot.

Early life
Thomas attended Hatch End High School on Headstone Lane in Hatch End, then Lowlands College in Harrow. At the University College of Wales Aberystwyth he gained a BSc in Economics in 1988 and later a PGCE from the Thames Polytechnic (now the University of Greenwich) in 1992. He gained an MA in Imperial and Commonwealth Studies from King's College London in 1996 and became a teacher.

Parliamentary career
Thomas was Chair of the Co-operative Party until he stood down from the position in 2019. Within the capacity of the role, he served as president of the 2003 Co-operative Congress. He was appointed Parliamentary Under-Secretary of State at the Department for International Development in 2003 and sponsored the Industrial and Provident Societies Act through Parliament.

In 2003, Thomas made an early attempt to ban smoking in restaurants with a Private Members' Bill.

After a June 2007 reshuffle, Thomas remained at International Development whilst also being part of the new Department for Business, Enterprise and Regulatory Reform, being appointed as Parliamentary Under-Secretary of State for Trade Policy and Consumer Affairs. He had the responsibility of co-ordinating trade policy between the two departments.

Following Gordon Brown's reshuffle of 3 October 2008, Thomas was promoted to Minister of State in both departments, taking on the portfolio of Trade, Investment and Consumer Affairs. In the June 2009 reshuffle DBERR was abolished, leaving Thomas to continue his role solely at International Development, with responsibility for consumer affairs passing to Kevin Brennan.

In May 2010 he was re-elected as Member of Parliament for Harrow West with a reduced majority (based on a notional 2005 result). He was Shadow Minister for Higher Education and Science from October 2010 to October 2011, Shadow Minister for Civil Society from October 2011 to October 2013, Shadow Minister for Europe from March 2013 to October 2014, then Shadow Minister for Africa and the Middle East from October 2014 to March 2015.

At the 2015 general election Conservative candidate Hannah David produced a swing from Labour to the Conservatives, and Thomas saw his majority reduced to 2,208.

In 2016, Thomas campaigned to remain within the European Union and has consistently favoured upholding the United Kingdom's membership in the Union.

He supported Owen Smith in the 2016 Labour Party leadership election. After Jeremy Corbyn's victory in the leadership election, Thomas was one of the first Labour MPs to return to the frontbench, as Shadow Minister for Local Government until June 2017.

In 2017, he voted against the bill permitting the government to start negotiations on withdrawal from the EU by sending an article 50 notice to the EU; in doing so he broke Labour's whip.

In the 2017 and 2019 general elections, Thomas was re-elected as the Member of Parliament for Harrow West with majorities of 13,314 and 8,692 respectively.

Thomas organised Harrow's first university fair at Whitmore High School in 2016, allowing students to engage with leading universities within the UK and abroad. The event has been held annually since, and due to its success an additional careers fair was arranged for late 2020.

Under Keir Starmer, Thomas has undertaken the role of Shadow Minister of International Trade since April 2020.

References

External links

 
 
 Find Your MP | Harrow West | Gareth Thomas  – BBC News
 Biography: Gareth R Thomas MP – Department for International Development
 Gareth R Thomas MP – Portfolio, Biography, Speeches – Department for Business, Enterprise & Regulatory Reform

1967 births
UK MPs 1997–2001
Alumni of the University of Greenwich
Alumni of Aberystwyth University
Alumni of King's College London
Labour Co-operative MPs for English constituencies
Presidents of Co-operative Congress
People from Harrow, London
English people of Welsh descent
Living people
UK MPs 2001–2005
UK MPs 2005–2010
UK MPs 2010–2015
UK MPs 2015–2017
UK MPs 2017–2019
UK MPs 2019–present